The Borneo broadfin shark or broadfin shark (Lamiopsis tephrodes) is a species of requiem shark, and part of the family Carcharhinidae.

See also

List of sharks

References

Lamiopsis
Fish described in 1905